Willem Klein (4 December 1912 – 1 August 1986), also known as Wim Klein or under his stage names Pascal and Willy Wortel, was a Dutch mathematician of Jewish ancestry, famous for being able to carry out very complicated calculations in his head very fast. On 27 August 1976, he calculated the 73rd root of a 500-digit number in 2 minutes and 43 seconds. This feat was recorded by the Guinness Book of Records.

Background
Wim Klein was born in Amsterdam, Netherlands on 4 December 1912 to Henry Klein, GP, and Emma Cohen. Klein had a rough childhood because his father wanted him to become a Doctor (as his father was), even though he was quite opposed to the idea. In addition to this pressure, his mother also committed suicide in 1929. In 1932, when Klein finished High School, despite wanting badly to pursue his love of mathematics, he gave in to his father's demands and enrolled at the University of Amsterdam for Medicine; he succeeded in getting his bachelor's degree in 1935. His father died in 1937, and though he passed the first part of his doctoral exam, he eventually gave up. It was around this time that he discovered his homosexuality. Both Klein and his older brother Leo were regularly examined by a neurologist in Amsterdam for their incredible computing capabilities. Stokvis labeled Wim as a "auditory calculator," and his brother Leo as a "visual calculator."

When the Germans invaded in May 1940, Klein began working in a Jewish hospital and continued with his doctoral studies in 1941. In 1942, though, he had to hide; his brother was captured and taken to the Sobibór extermination camp, where he died. After the war, Klein returned to his doctoral studies, but he also worked in circuses in France, Belgium, and the Netherlands, performing fast calculations as an act, often under the stage name 'Pascal'. He lived a fairly nomadic lifestyle and performed in such shows until 1952.

In 1952, Klein was hired by the Mathematisch Centrum (English: Mathematical Center) in Amsterdam as a scientific calculator. In 1954, the International Congress of Mathematicians was held in Amsterdam, so he attended. This inspired him to do shows again, so he went back to his nomadic lifestyle and performed internationally again for a few years until he was hired by CERN in 1958, but as computers became more powerful in the 1960s and physicists began programming more, Klein was more often used as a mascot for CERN who would do calculations for visitors, which he found disheartening.

Later years and death
In 1975, the commemoration of the 700th anniversary of Amsterdam made him feel homesick, and in 1976 he retired early from CERN. He continued to do calculations for show, this time with the stage name "Willy Wortel", although this time he started to become more interested in breaking records, trying hard to improve his time and beat new records. This continued until 1 August 1986, when Klein's housekeeper found him dead in his home in Amsterdam, brutally murdered with a knife. Although a young man was arrested, there was no evidence of his involvement in the case and he was soon released. The murder remains unsolved.

See also
List of unsolved murders

References

External links
Wim Klein's retirement show, CERN 1976
.
.

1912 births
1986 deaths
20th-century Dutch mathematicians
Dutch murder victims
Dutch people of Jewish descent
Male murder victims
Mental calculators
People associated with CERN
Scientists from Amsterdam
People murdered in the Netherlands
Unsolved murders in the Netherlands